Océane Dodin (born 24 October 1996) is a professional tennis player from France. Ranked by the Women's Tennis Association (WTA), she reached a career-high of 46 as a singles player in June 2017 and No. 375 in October 2017 as a doubles player. Dodin won the 2016 Coupe Banque Nationale in Québec as part of the WTA Tour and a further twelve singles titles on the ITF Women's Circuit.

Personal life
Dodin was born on 24 October 1996 in Lille, France. An only child, she played tennis with her parents and was coached by her father, Frédéric Dodin. Her tennis idols include Maria Sharapova and Roger Federer.

Professional career

2011–2013: French Open qualifying debut and first ITF title
Dodin began playing on the ITF Women's Circuit in July 2011 at the age of 14. She first participated at the $10K Valladolid tournament, where she qualified for the main draw. Her first significant achievement was in March 2012 at a $10K tournament in Bron, where she reached her first semifinal.

In April 2013, Dodin reached her first final on the professional tour and won the title at the $10K Les Franqueses del Valles tournament. She followed this up with her first Grand Slam qualifying at the French Open. As a wildcard, she faced a much higher ranked player, Teliana Pereira, and lost in straight sets.

2014: Good performances on the ITF Circuit, raising in the rankings and top 200 debut
Dodin did not make any progress in the first four months of 2014 but then won two back-to-back $10K tournaments in Antalya and Amarante. In July, she reached the semi-finals of a $15K tournament in Imola, before making it to the final of the $10K event in Valladolid. In September, she won her first $25K-level tournament in Shrewsbury and made her debut in the top 500.

This helped her make her WTA Tour debut – qualifying at the Luxembourg Open. She failed to reach the main draw, losing to Ivana Jorović. Dodin then reached her first final of the highest ITF-level tournament in Poitiers. She also advanced to the semifinals of the Open de Limoges, her debut on the WTA Challenger Tour. Finally, she won the $25K Zawada tournament by defeating Jeļena Ostapenko in the final, and so made her debut in the top 200.

2015: Grand Slam and WTA Tour debut

In the new season, Dodin made her Grand Slam main-draw debut at the Australian Open due to a wildcard. She won her first Grand Slam match, defeating Alison Riske in the first round. In the following round, she faced Karolína Plíšková but lost in the three sets. After a few attempts, she made her WTA Tour debut as a lucky loser at the Internationaux de Strasbourg. At the French Open, she was handed another Grand Slam wildcard but lost to Kurumi Nara in the first round.

In early June, she made her debut on grass, playing in the main draw of the Rosmalen Championships. At Wimbledon, she failed to reach the main draw and was forced to return to the ITF Circuit. At the US Open, she received another wildcard which allowed her to achieve a big win, when she defeated former No. 1, Jelena Janković, in the first round. By the end of the year, she played two more WTA tournament qualifyings. She first failed at the Linz Open, but then succeeded at the Luxembourg Open. She finished the year winning the title at the $25k Shrewsbury tournament.

2016: Breakthrough, first WTA Tour singles title and top 100 debut

The start of the year was not promising for Dodin. She failed in qualifying at Brisbane and Hobart, followed up with a first-round loss at the Australian Open. This brought her back to the ITF Circuit. However, from late January until April, she reached four ITF semifinals, including two $50K-level tournaments — at Andrézieux-Bouthéon and Croissy-Beaubourg. In April, she passed qualifying at two WTA events — the Stuttgart Open and Prague Open. Then, at the Madrid Open, she tried to make her Premier 5/Mandatory main-draw debut but failed in qualifying. At the French Open, she was handed a wildcard, but lost to former No. 1, Ana Ivanovic. After losing in the Wimbledon qualifying, she reached the final of the $100k Contrexéville clay court tournament. She lost to compatriot Pauline Parmentier.

Her switch to hardcourt tournaments that year was not successful. She lost in the first round of the Washington Open and failed to qualify into the Canadian Open. She returned to the ITF Circuit where she advanced into two $25K finals, losing the first but winning the second one. Between these two tournaments, she failed in the qualifying of the US Open. Following this, she participated at the carpet tournament Tournoi de Québec, where she had her breakthrough. In the final, she defeated qualifier Lauren Davis in straight sets. This result made her rank in the top 100 for the first time. A month later, as a qualifier, she reached the quarterfinals of the Linz Open after defeating two top 100 players - Kristýna Plíšková and Sorana Cîrstea. She then lost to Madison Keys. Two weeks later, she won the $100k Poitiers tournaments, again defeating Davis in the final.

2017: First top 10 win, top 50 debut and highest singles ranking

Dodin started the year with first-round losses in the qualifying draw at the Brisbane International and Sydney International. At the Australian Open, she came close to reaching her first Grand Slam third round. She won the first set against Caroline Garcia in the second round, but then Garcia made a turnaround. In late February, Dodin advanced to the quarterfinals of the Hungarian Ladies Open. In the quarterfinal match against Tímea Babos, she won the second set but lost the third. At the Sunshine Doubles – Indian Wells and Miami Open, she made her Premier Mandatory debut but lost in the first rounds of both tournaments. As a qualifier at the third Premier Mandatory tournament of the year, the Madrid Open, Dodin realized two important wins. She first defeated former top-10 player Andrea Petkovic and then made her first top-ten win over No. 5, Dominika Cibulková. In the third round, she lost to Kristina Mladenovic winning only three games.

Dodin then started to struggle with form. She failed to qualify into the Premier-5 Italian Open, following this up with second rounds at the Nuremberg Cup and French Open. She started preparing for the grass-court season at the $100K Surbiton Trophy, where she advanced to the semi-finals. As a result, she reached her highest singles ranking at world No. 46 on 12 June 2017. At the next two grass tournaments — Nottingam Open and $100K Ilkley Trophy — she failed in the first round. The same happened at Wimbledon, losing to Lucie Šafářová. A promising comeback happened at the following Washington Open where she switched from grass to hardcourt. There, she won against two former top-ten players, Jelena Janković and Sara Errani, followed by a win over top-20 player Sabine Lisicki. During her second-round match against Errani, Dodin saved three match points. In the semi-final match, she won the first set but then Ekaterina Makarova prevailed. By the end of year, she missed achieving any more significant results, losing in the early rounds of the Premier-5 Canadian Open and Cincinnati Open, and the US Open. She finished the year failing to defend her title at Québec, with a walkover after the first round due to dizziness.

2018–21: Struggles with form, return to top 100

Dodin got attention at the 2018 Miami Open, when she won the first set against world No. 1, Simona Halep, before losing the second-round match. Her other results during the season include first rounds at the Australian Open and French Open, as well as only the second round of qualifying at Wimbledon. In July, at the $100K Contrexéville tournament, she was forced to retire in the first round after the first set due to health problems. She could not play for the rest of the season.

Dodin returned in April 2019 to the ITF Circuit due to a drop in her rank. Her performance improved and in June she reached the semifinals of the $25K+H Figueira da Foz tournament. Two weeks later, she advanced to the final of the $25K Corroios-Seixal tournament. Soon after, she reached another $25K level semifinal, followed up with a same-level final in Koksijde. In early October, she won the title at the $25K+H Cherbourg-en-Cotentin tournament after defeating compatriot Harmony Tan. It was her first ITF title after three years. She finished the season with further success on the ITF Circuit, including the semifinal at the $80K Poitiers, as well as two $25K semifinals and one final.

In early February 2020, as a qualifier, Dodin advanced to the quarterfinals of the Premier St. Petersburg Trophy where she defeated Viktória Kužmová and former top-10 player Johanna Konta in the first two rounds. In her quarterfinal match against Elena Rybakina, Dodin won the first set and had match points but then lost the following two sets. She then won the title at the $25K Mâcon tournament. The following week, she reached the quarterfinal of the Lyon Open where she lost to No. 5, Sofia Kenin. She then started to struggle, reaching only first rounds of tournaments such as Premier 5 Cincinnati Open and US Open as a Grand Slam tournament. After winning the $25K Reims tournament in late October, she came to Linz where she advanced to the quarterfinals as a qualifier. There, she lost to Aryna Sabalenka, after being forced to retire during the second set. After these results, she ultimately finished 2020 ranked No. 107.

Dodin struggled with form during the 2021 season. Her first WTA Tour-level win was in May at the Serbia Open where she defeated Kristýna Plíšková in the first round. In the following round, she lost to Nadia Podoroska. She then had two first-round losses at Strasbourg and the French Open. Her grass-court season started with playing at the Nottingham Open, where she beat former top-10 player, CoCo Vandeweghe, in the first round. At Wimbledon, she failed in the last stage of qualifying. In late July, she advanced to the semifinals of the Palermo Open but lost her semifinal match to Elena-Gabriela Ruse in three sets. She followed this up with her first win at the WTA 1000 Canadian Open, defeating Karolína Muchová in the first round. In September, despite having not qualified for the main draw of the US Open, Dodin made her return to the top 100. Her last WTA Tour-level win was at the Luxembourg Open, where she beat Anastasia Zakharova. Her last tournament of the year was the WTA 500 Ostrava Open where she lost to Magda Linette in the opening round. She finished the season ranked No. 101.

Playing style

Océane Dodin is known for her ball-hitting power, an attribute common in her game. Her favorite streak consists of hitting hard from the baseline and concluding the point with a minimum of rallies (3 maximum), a risky game causing her to produce a high number of winning shots but also unforced errors during a match.

She declares herself to be more at ease on hardcourt than on clay, a surface less suited to her game. Her game is also suited to her limited endurance, the repetition of exchanges leading her to have side points. This style of play has been worked on since her early years in Villeneuve-d'Ascq targeting the glance and speed of execution.

In an interview for tennis.com, she said that she prefer her backhand over forehand, stating that backhand is something that makes her stronger. She also stated that her serve and forehand need improvement.

Performance timelines

Only main-draw results in WTA Tour, Grand Slam tournaments, Fed Cup/Billie Jean King Cup and Olympic Games are included in win–loss records.

Singles
Current through the 2022 Cluj.

Doubles

WTA career finals

Singles: 1 (1 title)

ITF Circuit finals

Singles: 26 (15 titles, 11 runner–ups)

Wins over top-10 players

Notes

References

External links

 
 

1996 births
Living people
French female tennis players
Sportspeople from Lille
People from Villeneuve-d'Ascq